Jonathan Dubas (born 4 March 1991) is a Swiss professional basketball player. He currently plays for the Norrköping Dolphins of the Basketligan in Sweden. Dubas re-signed with the team on 27 August 2018.

He has been a member of the Swiss national basketball team as well as Swiss youth national teams on several occasions.

References

External links
Real GM Profile
Eurobasket.com Profile

1991 births
Living people
BBC Monthey players
Centers (basketball)
Kangoeroes Basket Mechelen players
Leuven Bears players
Lugano Tigers players
Norrköping Dolphins players
People from Vevey
Power forwards (basketball)
Swiss men's basketball players
Sportspeople from the canton of Vaud